James Thaddeus Hammond (born December 11, 1856 – October 9, 1942) was the first Secretary of State of Utah.

Hammond was born in Farmington, Utah Territory, in 1856. He was baptized as a member of the Church of Jesus Christ of Latter-day Saints in 1864. From 1881 to 1882 he served as a Mormon missionary in the Southern States Mission. He was a lawyer and also involved in business. In 1884 and 1886 he served in the Utah Territorial Senate.  In 1895, he was elected Secretary of State and was reelected in 1900.

Sources
Andrew Jenson. Latter-day Saint Biographical Encyclopedia. Vol. 1, p. 723.

References

1856 births
1942 deaths
Latter Day Saints from Utah
Members of the Utah Territorial Legislature
19th-century American politicians
19th-century Mormon missionaries
American Mormon missionaries in the United States
Secretaries of State of Utah
People from Farmington, Utah